Ferenc Hornyák (born 25 July 1957) is a Hungarian weightlifter. He competed in the men's flyweight event at the 1980 Summer Olympics.

References

External links
 

1957 births
Living people
Hungarian male weightlifters
Olympic weightlifters of Hungary
Weightlifters at the 1980 Summer Olympics
Sportspeople from Jász-Nagykun-Szolnok County
World Weightlifting Championships medalists
20th-century Hungarian people